Turks and Caicos Islands competed at the 2010 Commonwealth Games in Delhi, India from 3 to 14 October 2010.  Eight competitors competed in two sports.  No medals were won.

Athletics

Men
Track & road events

Field Events

Key
Note–Ranks given for track events are within the athlete's heat only
Q = Qualified for the next round
q = Qualified for the next round as a fastest loser or, in field events, by position without achieving the qualifying target
NR = National record
N/A = Round not applicable for the event

Weightlifting

Men

References

Nations at the 2010 Commonwealth Games
2010